Haplogroup K2a1 may refer to:

 a subclade of Haplogroup K (mtDNA), or;
 a subclade of Haplogroup K2a (Y-DNA).